Skaneateles may refer to, in the United States:

 Skaneateles (village), New York, in Onondaga County
 Skaneateles (town), New York, in Onondaga County
 Skaneateles Lake, one of the Finger Lakes in New York State
 Skaneateles Creek, the creek that drains the lake
 Skaneateles Community, a short-lived 1840s utopian social experiment near Mottville, in the town of Skaneateles, New York